Erythrina stricta is a species of trees in the family Fabaceae identified by William Roxburgh in 1832.  It is now placed in the subfamily Faboideae and the tribe Phaseoleae.  This species has been recorded from the Indian subcontinent,<ref>Sanjappa M (1992) Legumes of India. Dehra Dun: Bishen Singh Mahendra...</ref> Indochina and China.   There is one valid variety: E. stricta var. suberosa''.

Erythrina stricta contains the indole alkaloid Hypaphorine

Gallery

References

External links

stricta
Trees of Asia
Taxa named by William Roxburgh